Niculina is a feminine Romanian given name. Notable people with the name include:

Niculina Oprea (born 1957), Romanian poet
Niculina Sasu (born 1952), Romanian handball player
Niculina Vasile (born 1958), Romanian high jumper

See also 
 Nicholas (name)

Romanian feminine given names